Systoloneura is a genus of moths in the family Gracillariidae.

Species
Systoloneura geometropis (Meyrick, 1936)
Systoloneura randiae Vári, 1961

External links
Global Taxonomic Database of Gracillariidae (Lepidoptera)

Gracillariinae
Gracillarioidea genera